Wallander – Innan frosten is a 2005 film about the Swedish police detective Kurt Wallander directed by Kjell-Åke Andersson. It is based on the novel with the same name by Henning Mankell.

The Plot 

Linda Wallander (Johanna Sällström) graduates from her police academy in Stockholm. Upon graduating, she moves back to Ystad, where her father, Kurt Wallander (Krister Henriksson) lives and works as a policeman. Wallander thinks that his daughters graduation is the day after the actual day, giving him a nasty surprise when she turns up unexpectedly at Ystad, and not too happy to see him. They both go out to investigate Linda's first case, which is the disappearance of an elderly lady, Birgitta Medberg.

Cast 
Krister Henriksson as Kurt Wallander
Johanna Sällström as Linda Wallander
Ola Rapace as Stefan Lindman
Ellen Mattsson as Anna Westin
Niklas Falk as Erik Westin
Angela Kovacs as Ann-Britt Höglund
Douglas Johansson as Martinsson
Mats Bergman as Nyberg
Fredrik Gunnarsson as Svartman
Chatarina Larsson as Lisa Holgersson
Jens Hultén as Torgeir
Karin Bertling as Birgitta Medberg
Malena Engström as Myran
Maria Arnadottir as Malin Krantz
Marianne Mörck as Ebba

References

External links 

Innan frosten
2005 films
2000s crime films
Films directed by Kjell-Åke Andersson
Police detective films
2000s police procedural films
2000s Swedish films